PPHS may refer to:

Picnic Point High School, a school in Sydney, Australia
Port Perry High School, a school in Port Perry, Ontario, Canada
Pinellas Park High School, a school in Largo, Florida